The Pressey-Eustis House is a historic house in Winchester, Massachusetts.  The -story wood-frame house was built in the early 1850s, and is a fine local example of Gothic Victorian decoration.  It has an L-shaped layout typical of the period, with a porch at the crook of the L. Its most distinctive features are the vergeboard featuring an unusual acorn pattern, and the finials at the gable tops.  George Eustis, town treasurer 1910–24, lived here from c. 1870 to 1940.

The house was listed on the National Register of Historic Places in 1989.

See also
National Register of Historic Places listings in Winchester, Massachusetts

References

Houses on the National Register of Historic Places in Winchester, Massachusetts
Houses in Winchester, Massachusetts